h Magazine was an American magazine, published by Apple Ridge Films, a company founded by photographer, Robert Todd Williamson. The publication covered entertainment news, film, television, music, theater, books, multimedia, and popular culture. h'''s primary focus was entertainment media and critical reviews, and, while it was aimed at the wider consumer market, the magazine's viewpoint was from an industry insider perspective.

History
The first issue was published on July 1, 2007 and featured actress, Julie Delpy, on its cover. The cover was shot by photographer, Laura Ann, in Paris, France. h was originally circulated as a free magazine in the greater Los Angeles, California area. In April 2008, h launched nationally and became a paid magazine, with Eddie Izzard featured on the cover. The magazine is no longer in publication or circulation.

Typical content and frequency
The magazine typically featured celebrities on its cover pages and included a fashion celebrity spread on the inside, in addition to profiles, reviews, and general interest stories.  All covers and fashion spreads were shot by the magazine's photographers.h was published bi-monthly.

Celebrity Covers
 Julie Delpy
 Perry Farrell
 Ben Foster
 Mira Sorvino
 Michael C. Hall
 Bryan Greenberg
 Sarah Michelle Gellar
 Sam Rockwell
 Eddie Izzard
 Evan Rachel Wood
 Sir Ben Kingsley
 Don Cheadle
 Haley Bennett
 Anna Paquin
 Kerry Washington
 Elijah Wood
 Jennifer Beals
 Rosario Dawson
 Mila Kunis

Layouth follows a typical magazine format by featuring a letters to the editor and table of contents in the first few pages, while also featuring advertisements. While some advertisements are unrelated to the entertainment industry, the majority of ads are typically related to fashion and upcoming television, film, or music events.

Features
The two largest stories in the magazine are the cover and the fashion story.  The cover story can run between six and twelve pages while the fashion story is typically eight. h fashion spread notables include the first major spread on TwilightVariety and Serena Williams. In addition, there are typically seven or eight major articles (one to two pages each) within the middle pages of the magazine. These articles are most commonly interviews, but there are also narrative articles as well. Feature articles tend to focus mostly on film and television. In the magazine's history, there have only been one non actor cover story (e.g.. Perry Farrell August 2007).

Articles
 "Hot Stuff" is a two-page gift buyers guide which includes Beauty, Entertainment, Clothing and Tech ideas.
 "ICON" is a two- to three-page look at the life of an artist who has made a major impact on the arts.
 "Architecture/Design" is a two- to four-page look at new structures, trends and people in the architectural field.
 "On the Set" is a four- to six-page look onto the set of a film or television show, interviewing the cast and crew.

Columns
 "What the h?" an irreverent pop culture observation column is written by actor/writer/producer Derek Waters.
 "Detour Journals" written by actor Tobias Jelinek is a raw exploration into subculture.
 "The Wine Dog" written by Bob Ecker highlights wine and other alcoholic beverages.

Reviews
The three sections of reviews are Film, Music and Food & Drink.  They take up six, eight and six pages respectively.

The sections are:

 "Film" typically features nine reviews both mainstream an independent titles.  Each review is rated using the five star system and includes a list of two or three other title the reader would like if they liked the reviewed film.  The magazine's Film Editor is Brent Simon.
 "Music" features reviews by Music Editor Devoe Yates and Assistant Music Editor Bill Dvorak.  The section comprises a main feature (two to four pages), the h Jukebox, a cross section of six reviews, a cult pick, and a netpick.  Each review is followed with a colorful Good For/Bad For commentary.
 "Food & Drink" covers restaurants and bars in Los Angeles and New York.  The section is six pages long and includes recipes.

Eventsh Magazine typically throws issue parties to celebrate their covers, and various movie premieres.  In addition h'' has  sponsored the HollyShorts film festival for the last three years.

Website
The magazine's website hmonthly.com provides users with daily content, breaking news, blogs, entertainment exclusives and serves as an archive for past magazine interviews, columns and photos.

References

External links
 Official website 

Bimonthly magazines published in the United States
Celebrity magazines published in the United States
Entertainment magazines published in the United States
News magazines published in the United States
Defunct magazines published in the United States
Free magazines
Magazines established in 2007
Magazines published in California
Magazines with year of disestablishment missing